Arawa Rural LLG is a local-level government (LLG) of the Autonomous Region of Bougainville, Papua New Guinea.

Wards
01. Kokoda
02. Torau
03. Kongara No. 1
04. Kongara No. 2 (Amiaming)
05. Eivo 1
06. Avaipa
07. Oune
08. Bava Pirung
09. North Nasioi
10. Apiatei
11. South Nasioi
12. Ioro 1
13. Ioro 2/Domana
14. Pinei-Nari
15. Ioro 3
82. Arawa Urban

References

Local-level governments of the Autonomous Region of Bougainville